Wathumullage Gratien Hubert Fernando CGA (1915 – 5 August 1942) was the leader of the Cocos Islands Mutiny, an agitator for the independence of Sri Lanka from the British.

Fernando was born to Sinhalese Buddhist parents. His father was a superintendent at the Ceylon Telegraph Office.

He went to school at St Thomas' College, Mt Lavinia. He was later converted to Roman Catholicism. He was impressed by the program of the Lanka Sama Samaja Party and by the anti-imperialist literature which it circulated but did not join the party. He was shipped off with his unit first to the Seychelles and later to Horsburgh Island in the Cocos Islands.

Here, he argued with his officers and agitated for action among his colleagues: his agenda was to create an increase in the support for Sri Lankan independence from British rule. He finally persuaded a core group to rebel, seize the island and signal the Japanese that they had done so; 30 out of 56 soldiers of his unit took part. On the night of 8/9 May, led by Fernando, men of the unit mutinied. However, their plan failed and the rebellion was suppressed the next day. The leaders of the mutiny were court-martialled and condemned within a week. The commanding officer on Cocos, Captain George Gardiner, an accountant in Colombo who obtained an emergency war commission, while focus of the mutineers' actions, also presided at the Field General Court Martial which convicted them.

Fernando’s father petitioned the army authorities to commute the death penalty and asked Sir Oliver Ernest Goonetilleke, the Civil Defence Commissioner, to intercede with Admiral Sir Geoffrey Layton, the British Commander of Ceylon. However, when Layton interviewed Fernando, he was adamant that he did not wish to be reprieved or pardoned. He told his family 'I’ll never ask a pardon from the British: that would disgrace the cause. Many years hence the World may hear my story'.

He was executed on 5 August 1942 at Welikada Prison, Ceylon, and two other mutineers shortly thereafter. They were the only British Commonwealth troops to be executed for mutiny during the Second World War. Fernando showed defiance to the end, his last words being "Loyalty to a country under the heel of a white man is disloyalty". He was buried at the Kanatte Cemetery in an unmarked grave.

References

Further reading 
Noel Crusz, The Cocos Islands Mutiny, Fremantle: Fremantle Arts Centre Press, 2001, .

1915 births
1942 deaths
Sri Lankan independence activists
Sri Lankan Roman Catholics
Executed Sri Lankan people
Executed military personnel
History of the Cocos (Keeling) Islands
20th-century executions by the United Kingdom
People executed by British Ceylon
Converts to Roman Catholicism from Buddhism
Date of birth missing
Ceylonese military personnel of World War II
People executed by the British military by firing squad
Sinhalese military personnel
People executed for mutiny
Alumni of S. Thomas' College, Mount Lavinia
Ceylon Garrison Artillery soldiers
People from Colombo